Guzmania fuerstenbergiana is a species of plant in the family Bromeliaceae. It is endemic to Ecuador.  Its natural habitats are subtropical or tropical dry forests and subtropical or tropical moist lowland forests. It is threatened by habitat loss.

References

fuerstenbergiana
Endemic flora of Ecuador
Endangered plants
Taxonomy articles created by Polbot